Foster Herbert "Steve" Slayton (April 26, 1902 – December 20, 1984) was a professional baseball relief pitcher who played briefly for the 1928 Boston Red Sox of Major League Baseball (MLB).

Biography
A native of Barre, Vermont, Slayton attended the University of New Hampshire where he played college baseball and college basketball. He was a member of the varsity baseball team in 1926, 1927, and 1928.

Slayton played minor league baseball during 1928 and 1929 for four different teams. He pitched in 28 games, compiling a win–loss record of 4–14. Slayton's major league career was limited to three appearances for the Boston Red Sox during a one-week period in July 1928. On July 21, he pitched the final inning of a Boston home loss to the Cleveland Indians, allowing no runs. On July 25, he pitched the final  innings of a Boston road loss to Cleveland, allowing one run. One July 28, he pitched  innings of a Boston road loss to the Detroit Tigers, allowing two runs. His total of seven innings pitched while allowing three runs yielded a 3.86 ERA. He recorded two strikeouts while allowing six hits and three walks, without registering a decision or a save.

Following his professional baseball career, Slayton was a high school coach in Vermont and New Hampshire; he coached the Spaulding High School baseball team in his hometown to four state championships; he retired in 1966. Slayton died in 1984 at the age of 82 in Manchester, New Hampshire. He was inducted to the University of New Hampshire's athletic hall of fame in 1986.

References

Further reading

External links

Major League Baseball pitchers
Baseball players from Vermont
Boston Red Sox players
Haverhill Hillies players
Waynesboro Red Birds players
Allentown Dukes players
Portland Mariners players
New Hampshire Wildcats baseball players
Baseball coaches from Vermont
1902 births
1984 deaths